KYYR-LP (97.9 FM, "The Bridge FM 97.9") is a radio station licensed to Yakima, Washington, United States. The station is currently owned by Calvary Chapel Yakima Valley.

References

External links
 
 

YYR-LP
Yakima, Washington
YYR-LP